The 1969 Dororo black and white anime series is based on the manga of the same name by Osamu Tezuka. In 1968, in order to pitch the series, Tezuka created a 13-minute full-color pilot which summarized the story Hyakkimaru's birth and upbringing and meeting with Dororo, and an abbreviated version of The Tale of the Monster Bandai. The series was produced in black and white coloring due to budget cuts, but made the demons look more weird and menacing.

While reasonably faithful to the original Dororo (1967–69) manga,  the network was originally concerned that the series was too dark because of the bloody battles, vistas of carnage and burning villages, so the cute dog Nota was added to the cast. In addition, the original grim music was replaced with a new and catchy piece, and the original animation of Dororo marching through fields of corpses was replaced with scenes of Dororo skipping playfully across village roofs.

Because the original manga series was cancelled before Tezuka had a chance to shift the focus towards Dororo's "coming-of-age" story as he had originally planned, most of the plots revolved around Hyakkimaru's battles with supernatural monsters.  This caused viewers to consider Hyakkimaru as the main character and from episode 14 onward, the series was re-titled . The early cancellation of the manga series also meant there were not enough stories for the required number of episodes so episodes 14, 15, 18, 19, 20, 23 and 25 were original stories developed specifically for the television series.

The series is first installment of World Masterpiece Theater, then known as Calpis Comic Theater, and the only one in black and white.

Episode list

See also
Dororo (2019 TV series)

References

1969 anime television series debuts
Action anime and manga
Dark fantasy anime and manga
Demons in anime and manga
Discotek Media
Fiction about curses
Fuji TV original programming
Historical fantasy anime and manga
Osamu Tezuka anime
Television shows set in Japan
World Masterpiece Theater series
Yōkai in anime and manga